John Elkins (May 23, 1815December 13, 1898) was an American jeweler, watchmaker, politician, and Wisconsin pioneer.  He was a member of the Wisconsin State Assembly, representing the city of Racine in the 1873 session.

Biography

John Elkins was born in Piermont, New Hampshire, on May 23, 1815.  He was raised on his family's farm until age 17, when he moved to Boston, Massachusetts, and apprenticed as a jeweler.  He then went to work as a journeyman jeweler for one year in Pittsburgh, Pennsylvania.  In 1837, he moved to St. Louis, Missouri, and purchased a lot in the city to operate a store, but an outbreak of Cholera forced him to cancel his plans.  He then moved to Rushville, Illinois, where he was able to open a shop and operate a business.  At the time, there were no other jewelers within 200 miles of his shop.

After four years in Rushville, Elkins relocated to Fort Madison, Iowa, and then, in the Fall of 1843, he came to the Wisconsin Territory and settled in the area now known as Kenosha, Wisconsin, (then "Southport").  He remained nine years in Kenosha before moving to the neighboring city of Racine, where he re-established his business.  Over the next several decades, he partnered with many different men for his business, first S. F. Heath for seven years, then his son, Edmund, who was his partner until his death in 1865, then he partnered with his daughters' husbands, George Beemer and H. J. Smith.  The last partnership lasted for 25 years, until Elkins' death, making it the oldest jewelry business in the county.

Politically, Elkins was a member of the Whig Party, and joined the Republican Party after it was organized in the 1850s.  He served as a member of the Racine school commission for two terms, and was elected to the Wisconsin State Assembly in 1872, serving in the 26th Wisconsin Legislature.  He represented Racine County's first Assembly district, which then comprised just the city of Racine.  He ran for re-election in 1873, but was defeated by Democrat Charles Frederick Bliss.

Elkins died at his home in Racine on December 13, 1898.  His death followed a long decline in health.

Personal life and family
John Elkins was the fourth child born to Josiah Elkins and his wife Nancy ( Shirley).  After his father's death in 1838, his mother came to live with him in the west until her death in 1867.

On January 22, 1840, John Elkins married Eliza Putnam in Rushville, Illinois.  Putnam was a native of Schenectady, New York.  They had four children together, one child died in childhood, and another died as a young man.  His wife died in 1897, just after their 57th anniversary.

Electoral history

Wisconsin Assembly (1872)

| colspan="6" style="text-align:center;background-color: #e9e9e9;"| General Election, November 5, 1872

| colspan="6" style="text-align:center;background-color: #e9e9e9;"| General Election, November 4, 1873

References

1815 births
1898 deaths
People from Grafton County, New Hampshire
People from Kenosha, Wisconsin
Politicians from Racine, Wisconsin
American jewellers
Businesspeople from Wisconsin
Wisconsin Whigs
School board members in Wisconsin
19th-century American businesspeople
19th-century American politicians
Republican Party members of the Wisconsin State Assembly